Taguatinga Esporte Clube, commonly known as Taguatinga, are a Brazilian football team from Taguatinga, in Distrito Federal. They  won the Campeonato Brasiliense five times and competed in the Série A once.

History
They were founded on July 1, 1975. The club won the Campeonato Brasiliense for the first time in 1981. Taguatinga competed in the Série A in 1982, when they finished in the last place of their group, and were relegated to the same year's Série B.

Stadium
They play their home games at the Serejão stadium. The stadium has a maximum capacity of 30,000 people.

Achievements

 Campeonato Brasiliense:
 Winners (5): 1981, 1989, 1991, 1992, 1993

References

Association football clubs established in 1975
Football clubs in Federal District (Brazil)
1975 establishments in Brazil